The 1876 United States presidential election in Missouri took place on November 7, 1876, as part of the 1876 United States presidential election. Voters chose 15 representatives, or electors to the Electoral College, who voted for president and vice president.

Missouri voted for the Democratic candidate, Samuel J. Tilden, over Republican candidate, Rutherford B. Hayes. Tilden won Missouri by a margin of 16.27%.

Results

See also
 United States presidential elections in Missouri

References

Missouri
1876
1876 Missouri elections